The Haitian Trade Union Coordination (CSH) is a trade union structure in Haiti. It collects together 14 established unions.
See Coordination Syndicale Haïtienne (CSH).  This was the primary labor organization that backed the overthrow of Haiti's democratically elected government. It was heavily financed by foreign aid organizations and attempted to group labor groups, often those who did not take part in its meetings or refused to join its protests. It has essentially worked as a shell organization for elites intent on undermining Haitian democracy.

References

Trade unions in Haiti